Banffshire and Buchan Coast (Gaelic: Siorrachd Bhanbh agus Oirthir Bhùchainn) is a constituency of the Scottish Parliament (Holyrood) covering parts of the council areas of  Aberdeenshire and Moray. It elects one Member of the Scottish Parliament (MSP) by the first past the post method of election. It is one also of ten constituencies in the North East Scotland electoral region, which elects seven additional members, in addition to ten constituency MSPs, to produce a form of proportional representation for the region as a whole.

The seat was created for the 2011 Scottish Parliament election, and covers areas that were formerly in the seats of Banff and Buchan, Gordon and Moray. It has been held by Karen Adam of the Scottish National Party since the 2021 Scottish Parliament election.

Electoral region 

The other nine constituencies of the North East Scotland region are: Aberdeen Central, Aberdeen Donside, Aberdeen South and North Kincardine, Aberdeenshire East, Aberdeenshire West, Angus North and Mearns, Angus South, Dundee City East and Dundee City West.

The region covers all of the Aberdeen City council area, the Aberdeenshire council area, the Angus council area, the Dundee City council area and part of the Moray council area.

Constituency boundaries and council area 

The constituency covers parts of both Aberdeenshire and Moray. It is one of the five constituencies covering Aberdeenshire in the Scottish Parliament, alongside Aberdeenshire East, Aberdeenshire West, Aberdeen South and North Kincardine and Angus North and Mearns. The rest of Moray is represented by the Moray constituency.

The seat was created following the First Periodic review of constituencies for the Scottish Parliament, and first contested at the 2011 Scottish Parliament election. It largely replaced the seat of Banff and Buchan which was abolished, and also includes areas that were formerly in the Gordon and Moray constituencies.

The electoral wards used in the creation of Banffshire and Buchan Coast constituency are:

In full: Banff and District, Troup, Fraserburgh and District, Peterhead North and Rattray, Buckie
In part: Peterhead South and Cruden (shared with Aberdeenshire East), Keith & Cullen (shared with Moray)

Member of the Scottish Parliament

Election results

2020s

2010s

References

External links

Politics of Aberdeenshire
Politics of Moray
Scottish Parliament constituencies and regions from 2011
Constituencies of the Scottish Parliament
Constituencies established in 2011
2011 establishments in Scotland
Peterhead
Fraserburgh
Banff, Aberdeenshire
Buckie